Bogdan Valentin Vișa (born 27 May 1986) is a Romanian professional footballer who plays as a defender for CSC 1599 Șelimbăr. Vișa made his Liga I debut on 14 September 2014 for Politehnica Iași in a 2–2 draw against Târgu Mureș. He also played for teams such as: FC Sibiu, Râmnicu Vâlcea, Alro Slatina, Gaz Metan Mediaș or Mioveni.

Honours
Viitorul Șelimbăr
Liga III: 2020–21

References

External links
 
 

1986 births
Living people
Sportspeople from Sibiu
Romanian footballers
Association football defenders
Liga I players
Liga II players
SCM Râmnicu Vâlcea players
FC Argeș Pitești players
FC Politehnica Iași (2010) players
CS Gaz Metan Mediaș players
CS Mioveni players
CSC 1599 Șelimbăr players